Arthur Richard Harrie Skey (13 February 1873 – 13 July 1942) was an English first-class cricketer and Royal Navy officer. Skey served as a surgeon in the Royal Navy from 1896, rising to the rank of surgeon rear-admiral. He also played first-class cricket for the Royal Navy.

Life and naval career
Skey was born at Lucknow in British India, before being educated in England at Dulwich College. From there he trained to be a surgeon at St Bartholomew's Hospital. After qualifying he joined the Royal Navy, where he was appointed as a surgeon in November 1896. He was promoted to the rank of staff surgeon in November 1904. Skey appeared in a single first-class cricket match for the Royal Navy against the British Army cricket team at Lord's in 1912. In the Army's first-innings, he took figures of 5 for 27, while in their second-innings he took figures of 1 for 90. Batting twice in the match, he was dismissed for 4 runs in the Royal Navy's first-innings by Francis Wyatt, while in their second-innings he was unbeaten without scoring. 

He served in the navy during the First World War, where he was mentioned in dispatches for actions during the Battle of Jutland. He was awarded the Order of Saints Maurice and Lazarus by Italy in August 1917. By July 1927, he held the rank of surgeon captain. It was in July 1927 that he was promoted to the rank of surgeon rear-admiral. He died at Royal Hospital Haslar at Gosport in July 1942.

References

External links

1873 births
1942 deaths
People from Lucknow
People educated at Dulwich College
Alumni of the Medical College of St Bartholomew's Hospital
19th-century English medical doctors
20th-century English medical doctors
Royal Navy officers
English cricketers
Royal Navy cricketers
Royal Navy personnel of World War I
Officers of the Order of Saints Maurice and Lazarus
Royal Navy rear admirals
British people in colonial India